The Willow Cree Reserve is an Indian reserve shared by Beardy's and Okemasis' Cree Nation and the One Arrow First Nation in Saskatchewan. It is 50 kilometres southwest of Prince Albert, and adjacent to Duck Lake.

References

Indian reserves in Saskatchewan